

A

A. Catrina Bryce
A. Elizabeth Adams
Abby Howe Turner
Abella
Ada Lovelace
Ada Yonath
Adele Goldberg (computer scientist)
Adrienne Mayor
Aglaonike
Agnes Arber
Agnes Fay Morgan Research Award
Agnes Mary Clerke
Agnes Pockels
Agnes Sime Baxter
Agnodice
Aisling Judge
Alejandra Bravo
Alenush Terian
Alessandra Giliani
Alexia Massalin
Alice Ball
Alice Cunningham Fletcher
Alice Eastwood
Alice L. Kibbe
Alice Leigh-Smith
Alice Middleton Boring
Alice Miller (psychologist)
Alice Pegler
Alice Stewart
Alice Y. Ting
Alicia Boole Stott
Allene Jeanes
Allison Randal
Almira Hart Lincoln Phelps
Amalie Dietrich
Amanda Chessell
Ana Aslan
Anat Cohen-Dayag
Andrea Bertozzi
Andrea Brand
Annette Dolphin
Angela Clayton
Angela Merkel
Angela Orebaugh
Angioletta Coradini
Anita Borg
Anita Goel
Anita Harding
Anita K. Jones
Anita Roberts
Anja Cetti Andersen
Ann Bishop (biologist)
Ann Haven Morgan
Ann Kiessling
Ann Nelson
Anna Atkins
Anna Botsford Comstock
Anna J. Harrison
Anna Karlin
Anna Mani
Anna Maria Hussey
Anna Morandi Manzolini
Anna Nagurney
Anna Stecksén
Anna Sundström
Anna Winlock
Anne Brewis
Anne Condon
Anne Elizabeth Ball
Anne H. Ehrlich
Anne McLaren
Anne Rudloe - PhD Marine Biology
Anne Simon
Anne Stine Ingstad
Anne Thynne
Anne Warner (scientist)
Annette Salmeen
Annie Antón
Annie Curtis
Annie Dale Biddle Andrews
Annie Easley
Annie Francé-Harrar
Annie Jump Cannon
Annie Lorrain Smith
Annie Meinertzhagen
Annie Scott Dill Maunder
Anousheh Ansari
Antje Boetius
Antonia Maury
Arete of Cyrene
Ariel Hollinshead
Arfa Karim
Artemisia II of Caria
Ashawna Hailey
Asima Chatterjee
Association for Women Geoscientists
Association for Women in Mathematics
Astrid Cleve
Audrey Stuckes
Audrey Tang
Ayanna Howard

B

Barbara A. Schaal
Barbara J. Meyer
Barbara Liskov
Barbara McClintock
Barbara Simons
Beatrice Helen Worsley
Beatrice Mabel Cave-Browne-Cave
Beatrice Mintz
Beatrice Tinsley
Beatrix Potter
Bernadine Healy
Berta Lutz
Bertha Swirles
Beryl May Dent
Beth Levine (physician)
Beth Shapiro
Beth Willman
Betsy Ancker-Johnson
Betty Holberton
Beyond Bias and Barriers
Bibha Chowdhuri
Birutė Galdikas
Brigitte Askonas
Bruria Kaufman

C

Caitlín R. Kiernan
Calrice di Durisio
Camilla Wedgwood
Cara Santa Maria
Carla J. Shatz
Carol A. Barnes
Carol Karp
Carol W. Greider
Carole Goble
Carole Jordan
Carole Meredith
Caroline Herschel
Carolyn Cohen
Carolyn Lawrence-Dill
Carolyn Porco
Carolyn R. Bertozzi
Carolyn S. Gordon
Carolyn Talcott
Carolyne M. Van Vliet
Carrie Derick
Caryn Navy
Catharine Parr Traill
Catherine Bréchignac
Catherine Coleman
Catherine G. Wolf
Catherine Hickson
Cecilia Krieger
Cecilia Payne-Gaposchkin
Cecilia R. Aragon
Celia Grillo Borromeo
Charlotte Auerbach
Charlotte Barnum
Charlotte Froese Fischer
Charlotte Moore Sitterly
Charlotte Scott
Chen Hang
Chien-Shiung Wu
Chrisanthi Avgerou
Christiane Desroches Noblecourt
Christiane Nüsslein-Volhard
Christina Miller
Christina Roccati
Christine Buisman
Christine Hamill
Christine Marie Berkhout
Claire F. Gmachl
Claire Fagin
Claire M. Fraser
Claire Voisin
Clara H. Hasse
Clara Immerwahr
Clara Southmayd Ludlow
Claribel Kendall
Claudia Alexander
Cleopatra the Alchemist
Clémence Royer
Colette Rolland
Constance Calenda
Corinna E. Lathan
Cornelia Clapp
Cynthia Bathurst
Cynthia Breazeal
Cynthia Dwork
Cynthia E. Rosenzweig
Cynthia Kenyon
Cécile DeWitt-Morette

D

Dana Angluin
Dana Randall
Dana Ron
Dana Ulery
Danese Cooper
Daniela Kühn
Daniela L. Rus
Danielle Bunten Berry
Daphne Jackson
Daphne Koller
Daphne Osborne
Darshan Ranganathan
Dawn Prince-Hughes
Deborah Charlesworth
Deborah Estrin
Dian Fossey
Diana Baumrind
Diane Greene
Diane Griffin
Diane Pozefsky
Diane Souvaine
Dina Lévi-Strauss
Donna Auguste
Donna Baird
Doris Mable Cochran
Dorit Aharonov
Dorotea Bucca
Dorothea Bennett
Dorothea Erxleben
Dorothea Jameson
Dorothea Klumpke
Dorothy E. Denning
Dorothy Garrod
Dorothy Hansine Andersen
Dorothy Hill
Dorothy Hodgkin
Dorothy Lewis Bernstein
Dorothy M. Needham
Dorothy Maud Wrinch

E

Edith Bülbring
Edith Marion Patch
Edith Pretty
Edna Grossman
Elaine Fuchs
Elaine Weyuker
Eleanor Anne Ormerod
Eleanor Glanville
Eleanor Maguire
Eli Fischer-Jørgensen
Elisabeth Altmann-Gottheiner
Elisabeth Hevelius
Élisabeth Lutz
Elizabeth Ann Nalley
Elizabeth Blackburn
Elizabeth Blackwell
Elizabeth Brown (astronomer)
Elizabeth Cabot Agassiz
Elizabeth Carne
Elizabeth Coleman White
Elizabeth Fulhame
Elizabeth Gertrude Britton
Elizabeth J. Feinler
Elizabeth Lee Hazen
Elizabeth Loftus
Elizabeth Nabel
Elizabeth Rather
Elizaveta Karamihailova
Elizaveta Litvinova
Ellen Gleditsch
Ellen Hayes
Ellen Spertus
Ellen Swallow Richards
Ellen Vitetta
Ellinor Catherine Cunningham van Someren
Elsa Beata Bunge
Elsie M. Burrows
Elsie MacGill
Elsie Maud Wakefield
Elsie Widdowson
Emer Jones
Émilie du Châtelet
Emilie Snethlage
Emma P. Carr
Emmy Noether
Enid Mumford
Erika Pannwitz
Esther Lederberg
Esther M. Conwell
Esther Orozco
Ethel Browne Harvey
Ethel Sargant
Ethel Shakespear
Etheldred Benett
Etta Zuber Falconer
Eugenia Del Pino
Eugenie Clark
Eva Bayer-Fluckiger
Eva Ekeblad
Eva Nogales
Evelyn Berezin
Evelyn Boyd Granville
Evelyn Fox Keller
Evelyn Hu
Éva Tardos
Evi Nemeth

F

F. Gwendolen Rees
FASEB Excellence in Science Award
Fan Chung
Faustina Pignatelli
Flora Wambaugh Patterson
Florence Bascom
Florence Nightingale
Florence R. Sabin
Florence Wells Slater
Florence Wambugu
Florentina Mosora
Floy Agnes Lee
Fotini Markopoulou-Kalamara
Frances A. Rosamond
Frances Ashcroft
Frances Cave-Browne-Cave
Frances E. Allen
Frances Hardcastle
Frances Hugle
Frances Kirwan
Frances Meehan Latterell
Frances Theodora Parsons
Frances Yao
Francine Berman
Françoise Barré-Sinoussi
Frederica Darema

G

Gabriele Rabel
Gail Williams
Garvan–Olin Medal
Geertruida de Haas-Lorentz
George and Elizabeth Peckham
Gerta Keller
Gertrud Theiler
Gertrude B. Elion
Gertrude Bell
Gertrude Blanch
Gertrude Caton–Thompson
Gertrude Mary Cox
Gertrude Neumark
Gertrude Scharff Goldhaber
Gertrude Simmons Burlingham
Gerty Cori
Gillian Bates
Gina G. Turrigiano
Gisela Richter
Gisèle Lamoureux
Gitte Moos Knudsen
Giuseppa Barbapiccola
Gladys Kalema-Zikusoka
Glenda Schroeder
Grace Chisholm Young
Grace Evelyn Pickford
Grace Frankland
Grace Hopper
Greta Stevenson
Grete Hermann

H

Halszka Osmólska
Hannah Monyer
Harriet Boyd-Hawes
Harriet Brooks
Harriet Mann Miller
Harriet Margaret Louisa Bolus
Hava Siegelmann
Hazel Alden Reason
Hazel Bishop
Heather Couper
Heather Reid
Hedwig Kohn
Hedy Lamarr
Heidi Jo Newberg
Helen Dean King
Helen Flanders Dunbar
Helen G. Grundman
Helen Gwynne-Vaughan
Helen M. Berman
Helen Megaw
Helen Murray Free
Helen Porter
Helen Quinn
Helen Ranney
Helen Sharman
Helen T. Edwards
Henrietta Swan Leavitt
Henriette Avram
Herrad of Landsberg
Herta Freitag
Hertha Marks Ayrton
Hertha Sponer
Hertha Wambacher
Hilda Geiringer
Hilda Phoebe Hudson
Hilde Mangold
Hildegard of Bingen
Hu Hesheng
Huguette Delavault
Hypatia
Hélène Langevin-Joliot

I

Ida Henrietta Hyde
Ida Noddack
Ileana Streinu
Inge Lehmann
Ingrid Daubechies
Iota Sigma Pi
Irene Crespin
Irene Fischer
Irene Manton
Irene Uchida
Irina Beletskaya
Iris M. Ovshinsky
Irma Wyman
Irmgard Flügge-Lotz
Irène Joliot-Curie
Isabel Bassett Wasson
Isabel Briggs Myers
Isabella Bird
Isobel Bennett

J

Jacqueline Felice de Almania
Jacquetta Hawkes
Jaime Levy
Jaime Teevan
Jan Anderson (scientist)
Janaki Ammal
Jane Brotherton Walker
Jane Colden
Jane Ellen Harrison
Jane Goodall
Jane Hillston
Jane Lubchenco
Jane Marcet
Jane S. Richardson
Jane Stafford
Janet Darbyshire
Janet G. Travell
Janet Kear
Janet L. Kolodner
Janet Rowley
Janet Thornton
Janet Vaughan
Janet Watson
Janice E. Clements
Jean Bartik
Jean Beggs
Jean Jenkins (ethnomusicologist)
Jean E. Sammet
Jeanne Dumée
Jeanne Ferrante
Jeanne Villepreux-Power
Jeanette Scissum
Jeannette Wing
Jeehiun Lee
Jemma Geoghegan
Jennifer Tour Chayes
Jennifer Doudna
Jenny Preece
Jessica Meir
Jill Farrant
Jill Stein
Jill Tarter
Jing Li (chemist)
Joan A. Steitz
Joan Beauchamp Procter
Joan Birman
Joan Dingley
Joan Hinton
Joan Roughgarden
Joan Slonczewski
Joanna S. Fowler
Joanne Simpson
Jocelyn Bell Burnell
Johanna Mestorf
Johanna Moore
Josephine Kablick
Joy Adamson
Joyce Currie Little
Joyce Jacobson Kaufman
Joyce K. Reynolds
Joyce Lambert
Jude Milhon
Judith Donath
Judith Estrin
Judith Goslin Hall
Judith Q. Longyear
Judith Resnik
Judy A. Holdener
Julia Anna Gardner
Julia Serano
Juliet Wege
June Almeida

K

Kaisa Sere
Kalpana Chawla
Kamal Ranadive
Kamala Sohonie
Karen Kavanagh
Karen Spärck Jones
Karen Vousden
Karen Wetterhahn
Karin Erdmann
Kate Craig-Wood
Kate Hutton
Kateryna Lohvynivna Yushchenko
Katharine Burr Blodgett
Katharine Fowler-Billings
Katharine Way
Katherine Esau
Katherine Freese
Katherine Johnson
Katherine St. John
Kathleen Antonelli
Kathleen Booth
Kathleen C. Taylor
Kathleen Haddon
Kathleen Kenyon
Kathleen Lonsdale
Kathleen Maisey Curtis
Kathleen Taylor (biologist)
Kathrin Bringmann
Kathryn Moler
Kathryn Uhrich
Katsuko Saruhashi
Kay Redfield Jamison
Kiki Sanford
Kirstine Meyer
Klara Dan von Neumann
Klara Kedem
Krystal Tsosie
Krystyna Kuperberg
Käte Fenchel

L

L'Oréal-UNESCO Awards for Women in Science
L'association femmes et mathématiques
Laura Bassi
Leah Jamieson
Lene Hau
Lenore Blum
Leona Woods
Lera Boroditsky
Leslie Barnett
Lila Kari
Lilian Gibbs
Lillian Dyck
Lily Young
Linda Avey
Linda B. Buck
Linda Keen
Lisa Hensley (microbiologist)
Lisa Kaltenegger
Lisa M. Diamond
Lisa Randall
Lisa Rossbacher
Lise Meitner
List of prizes, medals, and awards for women in science
Liuba Shrira
Lois Haibt
Lori McCreary
Louise Dolan
Louise Hammarström
Louise Hay (mathematician)
Louise Johnson
Louise Reiss
Louise du Pierry
Lucia Galeazzi Galvani
Lucile Quarry Mann
Lucy Everest Boole
Lucy Jones
Lucy Weston Pickett
Lucy Wilson
Luisa Ottolini
Luise Meyer-Schützmeister
Lydia Kavraki
Lydia Maria Adams DeWitt
Lydia Rabinowitsch-Kempner
Lynn Conway
Lynn J. Rothschild
Lynn Margulis
Lynne Jolitz
Lanying Lin

M

M. Christine Zink
Mae Jemison
Maja Mataric
Manuela M. Veloso
Marcia McNutt
Marcia Neugebauer
Margaret Brimble
Margaret Bryan (philosopher)
Margaret Burbidge
Margaret Cavendish, Duchess of Newcastle-upon-Tyne
Margaret Clement
Margaret Eliza Maltby
Margaret Elizabeth Barr-Bigelow
Margaret Floy Washburn
Margaret Fountaine
Margaret H. Wright
Margaret Hamilton (scientist)
Margaret Kennard
Margaret Lindsay Huggins
Margaret Mead
Margaret Morse Nice
Margaret Oakley Dayhoff
Margaret Ogola
Margaret Stanley (virologist)
Margaret Thatcher
Margrete Heiberg Bose
Marguerite Perey
Maria Ardinghelli
Maria Christina Bruhn
Maria Chudnovsky
Maria Cunitz
Maria Dalle Donne
Maria Fadiman
Maria Fitzgerald
Maria Gaetana Agnesi
Maria Goeppert-Mayer
Maria Klawe
Maria Klenova
Maria Margarethe Kirch
Maria Medina Coeli
Maria Mitchell
Maria Petraccini
Maria Reiche
Maria Sibylla Merian
Maria Wilman
Maria Zemankova
Maria Zuber
Marian Farquharson
Marian Koshland
Marian Stamp Dawkins
Mariann Bienz
Marianna Csörnyei
Marie-Andrée Bertrand
Marie-Anne Pierrette Paulze
Marie-Jeanne de Lalande
Marie Beatrice Schol-Schwarz
Marie Crous
Marie Curie
Marie Le Masson Le Golft
Marie Stopes
Marie Tharp
Marietta Blau
Marilyn Farquhar
Marilyn Tremaine
Marissa Mayer
Marjolein Kriek
Marjorie Courtenay-Latimer
Marjorie Lee Browne
Marjorie Sweeting
Marjory Stephenson
Marta Kwiatkowska
Martha Burton Woodhead Williamson
Martha Chase
Martha P. Haynes
Marthe Vogt
Mary-Claire King
Mary Adela Blagg
Mary Agnes Chase
Mary Allen Wilkes
Mary Anning
Mary Ball
Mary Buckland
Mary Cartwright
Mary Celine Fasenmyer
Mary Engle Pennington
Mary Everest Boole
Mary F. Lyon
Mary Gibson Henry
Mary Higby Schweitzer
Mary J. Rathbun
Mary Jane Irwin
Mary K. Gaillard
Mary Katharine Brandegee
Mary Kenneth Keller
Mary L. Boas
Mary L. Cleave
Mary L. Good
Mary Leakey
Mary Lee Woods
Mary Lua Adelia Davis Treat
Mary Murtfeldt
Mary P. Dolciani
Mary Parke
Mary Peters Fieser
Mary Shaw (computer scientist)
Mary Somerville
Mary Stuart MacDougall
Mary Tindale
Mary Vaux Walcott
Mary W. Gray
Mary Ward (scientist)
Mary Watson Whitney
Mary Whiton Calkins
Mary the Jewess
María Elena Galiano
María de los Ángeles Alvariño González
Mathilde Krim
Maud Cunnington
Maud Menten
Maureen C. Stone
Maxine D. Brown
Maxine Singer
Maya Paczuski
Mayana Zatz
Melba Phillips
Mercuriade
Meredith L. Patterson
Merieme Chadid
Merit-Ptah
Merle Greene Robertson
Michelle Antoine
Mildred Allen (physicist)
Mildred Cohn
Mildred Dresselhaus
Mileva Marić
Mina Bissell
Ming C. Lin
Miriam Rothschild
Misha Mahowald
Molly Holzschlag
Monica Anderson
Monica S. Lam
Monique Adolphe
Morag Crichton Timbury
Muriel Wheldale Onslow
Myra Wilson
Myriam Sarachik
Myrtle Bachelder
Mária Telkes

N

Nalini Nadkarni
Nan Laird
Nancy Adams (botanist)
Nancy Andrews (biologist)
Nancy Davis Griffeth
Nancy Hafkin
Nancy Hopkins (scientist)
Nancy Leveson
Nancy Lynch
Nancy Wexler
Naomi Ginsberg
Naomi Oreskes
Nettie Stevens
Nichole Pinkard
Nicola Pellow
Nicole-Reine Lepaute
Nicole King
Nicole Marthe Le Douarin
Nina Andreyeva
Nina Bari
Nina Byers
Ninni Kronberg
Noemie Benczer Koller
Noreen Murray

O

Olga Aleksandrovna Ladyzhenskaya
Olga Holtz
Olga Lepeshinskaya (biologist)
Olivia Lum
Orna Berry
Ottoline Leyser

P

Pamela C. Rasmussen
Pamela J. Bjorkman
Pamela L. Gay
Pascale Cossart
Patricia Adair Gowaty
Patricia Baird
Patricia Bath
Patricia H. Clarke
Patricia Vickers-Rich
Patsy O'Connell Sherman
Pattie Maes
Paulien Hogeweg
Pauline Morrow Austin
Pauline Newman
Pearl Kendrick
Persis Drell
Petronella Johanna de Timmerman
Philippa Fawcett
Philippa Marrack
Phyllis Clinch
Phyllis Fox
Phyllis Starkey
Ping Fu
Pippa Greenwood
Polly Matzinger
Praskovya Uvarova

R

Rachel Carson
Rachel Fuller Brown
Rachel Mamlok-Naaman
Radia Perlman
Rama Bansil
Rebecca Grinter
Rebecca J. Nelson
Reihaneh Safavi-Naini
Renata Kallosh
Renate Chasman
Renate Loll
Renu C. Laskar
Renée Miller
Rima Rozen
Rita Levi-Montalcini
Rita P. Wright
Rosa Beddington
Rosa Smith Eigenmann
Rosalind Franklin
Rosalind Picard
Rosalind Pitt-Rivers
Rosaly Lopes
Rosalyn Sussman Yalow
Rosemary A. Bailey
Roxana Moslehi
Ruby Hirose
Runhild Gammelsæter
Ruth Aaronson Bari
Ruth Arnon
Ruth Benedict
Ruth F. Allen
Ruth Hubbard
Ruth Lawrence
Ruth Patrick
Ruth R. Benerito
Ruth Turner
Ruzena Bajcsy
Rózsa Péter

S

Saba Valadkhan
Sabina Jeschke
Sabina Spielrein
Sallie W. Chisholm
Sally Floyd
Sally Ride
Sally Shlaer
Salome Gluecksohn-Waelsch
Sameera Moussa
Sandra Faber
Sandra Steingraber
Sandy Carter
Sara Billey
Sara Hestrin-Lerner
Sara Plummer Lemmon
Sara Shettleworth
Sarah Allen (software developer)
Sarah Flannery
Sarah Frances Whiting
Sarit Kraus
Seema Bhatnagar
Shafi Goldwasser
Sharon Glotzer
Sheena Josselyn
Sheeri Cabral
Sheila Greibach
Sheina Marshall
Sheri McCoy
Sherry Gong
Shirley Ann Jackson
Shirley M. Tilghman
Shirley Sherwood
Shoshana Kamin
Silvia Arber
Snježana Kordić
Sophia Brahe
Sophia Drossopoulou
Sophia Jex-Blake
Sophie Bryant
Sophie Germain
Sophie Wilson
Stefanie Dimmeler
Stella Atkins
Stella Cunliffe
Stella Ross-Craig
Stephanie Kwolek
Stephanie Schwabe
Stormy Peters
Sue Black (computer scientist)
Sue Hartley
Sue Hendrickson
Sue Whitesides
Sulamith Goldhaber
Susan Blackmore
Susan Dumais
Susan Gerhart
Susan Greenfield, Baroness Greenfield
Susan Hockfield
Susan Hough
Susan Howson
Susan Jane Cunningham
Susan Kieffer
Susan L. Graham
Susan Landau
Susan Owicki
Susan R. Wessler
Susan Solomon
Susana López Charreton
Susanne Albers
Suzanne Cory
Sylvia Earle
Sylvia Fedoruk

T

Tamara Mkheidze
Tandy Warnow
Tanya Atwater
Tara Keck
Tapputi
Tasneem Zehra Husain
Tatyana Afanasyeva
Tatyana Pavlovna Ehrenfest
Telle Whitney
Temple Grandin
Teresa Maryańska
Terri Attwood
Theano (philosopher)
Thelma Estrin
Theodora Lisle Prankerd
Tomoko Ohta
Toniann Pitassi
Tracy Caldwell Dyson
The Trimates
Trotula
Tu Youyou

U

Ursula Cowgill
Ursula Franklin
Ursula Martin
Uta Frith

V

Val Beral
Valerie Thomas
Vasanti N. Bhat-Nayak
Vera Kublanovskaya
Vera Popova
Vera Rubin
Vera Scarth-Johnson
Vera Yurasova
Vi Hart
Virginia Apgar
Vyda Ragulskienė

W

Wanda Orlikowski
Wanda Zabłocka
Wang Xiaoyun
Webe Kadima
Weizmann Women & Science Award
Wendy Foden
Wendy Hall
Wilhelmina Feemster Jashemski
Williamina Fleming
Wilma Olson
Winifred Asprey

X

Xie Xide

Y

Yu-Chie Chen
Yvette Cauchois
Yvonne Barr
Yvonne Choquet-Bruhat

Z

Zeng Fanyi
Zoia Ceaușescu
Zora Neale Hurston

Trans man scientists who were scientists before transitioning

Ben Barres (Barbara Barres)

Transmasculine non-binary scientists who were scientists before transitioning

A. W. Peet (Amanda Wensley Peet)

Transfeminine non-binary scientists 

JJ Eldridge
Audrey Tang

See also
List of female Fellows of the Royal Society
List of female mathematicians
List of female scientists before the 21st century
List of women geologists
Women in chemistry
Women in computing
Women in geology
Women in science
Women in STEM fields

References
 Herzenberg, Caroline L. 1986. Women Scientists from Antiquity to the Present: An Index. Locust Hill Press. 
 Howard S. The Hidden Giants, ch. 2, (Lulu.com; 2006) (accessed 22 August 2007)
 Howes, Ruth H. and Caroline L. Herzenberg. 1999. Their Day in the Sun: Women of the Manhattan Project. Temple University Press. 
 Ogilvie, M. B. 1986. Women in Science. The MIT Press. 
 Contributions of 20th Century Women to Physics website at UCLA
 Walsh JJ. 'Medieval Women Physicians' in Old Time Makers of Medicine: The Story of the Students and Teachers of the Sciences Related to Medicine During the Middle Ages, ch. 8, (Fordham University Press; 1911) (accessed 22 August 2007)

writers
scientists
Women scientists
.Science
.Writers